The 1971 Bandy World Championship was the seventh Bandy World Championship and was contested between four men's Bandy playing nations.  The championship was played in Sweden from 3–14 March 1971. The Soviet Union became champions.

Teams

Premier tour
 3 March
 Soviet Union – Finland 5–3
 Sweden – Norway 4–2
 5 March
 Soviet Union – Norway 8–1
 Sweden – Finland 3–2
 7 March
 Finland – Norway 6–1
 Soviet Union – Sweden 2–2
 10 March
 Soviet Union – Finland 4–2
 Norway – Sweden 0–3
 12 March
 Finland – Sweden 1–4
 Soviet Union – Norway 3–1
 13 March
 Norway – Finland 1–7
 14 March
 Soviet Union – Sweden 2–1

References

1971
1971 in bandy
1971 in Swedish sport
International bandy competitions hosted by Sweden
March 1971 sports events in Europe
1970s in Gothenburg
International sports competitions in Gothenburg